Bedrock is a type of rock underlying the Earth's surface.

Bedrock may also refer to:

Music
Bedrock (duo), a British electronic music duo comprising John Digweed and Nick Muir
Bedrock Records, a British electronic music record label founded by the above duo

Albums
Bedrock (album), a 1999 compilation album by John Digweed
Bedrock 3, a 2002 compilation album by Chris Fortier
Bedrock (EP), a 1987 EP by The Foetus All-Nude Revue, or the title song

Songs
"BedRock", a 2009 song by hip-hop group Young Money 
"Bedrock", a 1986 song by D.I. from Horse Bites Dog Cries
"Bedrock", a 1987 song by Giorgio from Sex Appeal

Technology
Bedrock (framework), a cross-platform project between Apple Computer and Symantec
Bedrock plane, a type of hand plane
Operation Bedrock, a series of 27 nuclear tests

Other uses
 Bedrock (The Flintstones), the name of the fictional town from The Flintstones
 Bedrock, Colorado, an unincorporated town in the United States
 Minecraft: Bedrock Edition, a version of the video game Minecraft used for console 
 Operation Bedrock (Laos), a military operation of the Laotian Civil War